The Invisible may refer to:

The Invisible (2002 film), a Swedish thriller film by Joel Bergvall and Simon Sandquist based on Mats Wahl’s YA novel
The Invisible (2007 film), a Swedish-American thriller film based on the book and the 2002 film
The Invisible (soundtrack)
The Invisible (2020 film), a Spanish film
The Invisible (band), a British band
The Invisible (album), their debut album